JCCMI Christian Academy Inc. (JCAI) is a private school located in the city of Dagupan, Philippines. It was known as Jesus Christian Community Ministry International (JCCMI) with an education program called Children's Care and Learning Center (CCLC).

The school primary offers pre-elementary, elementary, and secondary education. It was started in April 1986 by Rev. Isias Campos. With his death on July 29, 2006, his wife, Rev. Marlyn Campos, took over as the director. Their eldest son, Ptr. Isamarjoe Campos, acts as the principal of JCAI. Ptr. Joel Arenas is the current Supervisor of Elementary and Highschool. Elizabeth Arenas is the teacher of the Pre-school department.

JCAI provides education using School of Tomorrow (SOT) curriculum in line with DepEd curriculum.

References

Schools in Dagupan